Islands is the second studio album from Swedish dream pop band the Mary Onettes. The album was released on 3 November 2009 in the United States, and a day later in Sweden. The album had to be re-recorded from scratch after lead singer Philip Ekström stated on the band's official website, "...I basically lost every song I've ever recorded with the Mary Onettes. My hard drive with all my music was stolen in my car one fine afternoon in Stockholm, the very same fine afternoon we came home from our US tour, the very same day I was feeling thrilled to come home and start the process of finishing our new album. Of course I had made a backup copy on my computer at home. But for some reason a power failure in the building made that hard drive collapse too. Unbelievable. I was speechless for days." The band played the Primavera Sound Festival in Spain in May 2008, and reconvened in the studio to start the recording process again in September.

The band's Dare EP was released in April 2009, intended as a sampler of the Islands album. It featured two album tracks ("Dare" and "God Knows I Had Plans") and an exclusive non-album track ("Kicks"). Ekström said of the album's name: "The title Islands came up because I see the tracks on the album as small islands in different shapes and forms where every song is like a record of  very own. Johan on Labrador Records suggested the same title without having heard me mentioning the idea, so that was a coincidence too good not to pursue. The songs are almost too personal and I've had a hard time playing them for friends. It's like all I want to do is keep them to myself".

Reception

Islands received mixed to positive reviews from critics. On Metacritic, the album holds a score of 66/100 based on 9 reviews, indicating "generally favorable reviews."

Track listing

Release history

Credits
 All songs produced and recorded by Philip Ekström and Henrik Ekström.
 Recorded at the House Arrest Studio, Gothenburg, and Foundland Studio, Jönköping.
 Strings on tracks 1, 2, 3, 5, 7, 8 and 10 by Karin Hagström and Lina Molander. Arranged by Henrik Ekström and Philip Ekström.
 Backing vocals on "The Disappearance of My Youth" by Ebba Sahlin, Isa Almgren, Majja Sahlin, and Agnes Evertsson.
 Backing vocals on "Bricks" by Sara Mårtensson and Hanna-Maria Backvall.
 Mastered by Erik Broheden at Masters of Audio, except "Century" mastered by Björn Engelmann at Cutting Room Studios.
 Photos by Henrik Mårtensson; artwork by Peter Eriksson.

References

2009 albums
The Mary Onettes albums
Labrador Records albums